Hellboy: Sword of Storms is the first of the Hellboy Animated series based on Mike Mignola's popular comic book series Hellboy and the live-action film of the same name. It was released in 2006 on DVD and premiered later that same year on Cartoon Network. The second animated straight-to-DVD film, Hellboy: Blood and Iron, was released on 17 March 2007.

The film was produced by Starz Media, Revolution Studios and Film Roman and co-produced, co-written, and directed by animation veteran Tad Stones. Stones is perhaps best known as the creator of the popular Disney Afternoon series Darkwing Duck. He worked with Mignola on developing Atlantis: The Lost Empire into an animated series.
The film's storyline is based in part upon the Hellboy: The Right Hand of Doom storyline from the original comics.

Hellboy: Sword of Storms was nominated for Outstanding Animated Program (For Programming One Hour or More) at the 59th Primetime Emmy Awards.

Plot
Liz Sherman and Abe Sapien enter a Mayan temple, where they find Hellboy battling a gigantic zombie bat, and engage its zombie followers. The group are eventually able to defeat their opponents when Liz unleashes her pyrokinetic powers, although she is still unsure of her ability to control those powers.

Meanwhile, Japanese folklore expert Professor Mitsuyasu Sakai obtains an ancient scroll. It tells the myth of two demonic brothers, Thunder and Lightning. Hundreds of years ago, the brothers roamed Japan, unleashing storms on the lands of a Daimyō (lord). In exchange for mercy, the Daimyō promises to give them his beautiful daughter. One of the Daimyō's samurai warriors is in love with the daughter and hides her in a shrine to protect her. Armed with the Sword of Storms, a mystical katana imbued with an ancient spell to defeat Thunder and Lightning, the warrior battles the demons and traps their spirits in the sword. Although his lands and daughter are saved, the Daimyō is displeased because the samurai has broken the Daimyō's promise, a dishonor. In vengeance, the Daimyō summons the gods to turn the warrior to stone and then kills his daughter in the shrine.

In current-day Japan, Professor Sakai is possessed by the spirits of Thunder and Lightning while reading the scroll. The demonic brothers send the professor in search of the mystical sword. When he attacks its current owner, the Bureau for Paranormal Research and Defense is alerted and Hellboy, Kate Corrigan, and a psychic named Russell Thorne are called in to investigate. During the investigation, Hellboy picks up a discarded katana and vanishes to another dimension that is reminiscent of ancient Japan. Hellboy meets a wise kitsune, who tells him that he holds the Sword of Storms and that the goal of his journey lies to the west. Hellboy travels through the alternate universe and learns that he can only return to his own world by breaking the sword, although that will also free the demonic brothers. Along the way, Hellboy encounters several mythical Yōkai, sent by the still-possessed Sakai, who try to steal the sword from him, including the kappa, a trio of rokurokubi, a group of nukekubi, a Jorōgumo, Gashadokuro, tengu, Yomotsu-shikome, and the restless ghost of the Daimyō's daughter. Hellboy is able to outsmart or defeat all of them.

Meanwhile, Abe Sapien and Liz Sherman are called to the sites of disturbing earthquakes and discover that Thunder and Lightning are summoning their brothers, the dragons. They meet the same kitsune who guided Hellboy and are instructed to stop the dragons. A sea-dragon attacks them, but Liz manages to hold it back using her pyrokinetic abilities.

Professor Sakai travels to the shrine where the Daimyō killed his daughter, followed by Kate and Russell who have just survived an attack by several objects from Japanese folklore. At the same time, Hellboy is tricked into smashing the sword against the samurai's stone form, which destroys the sword, releases Thunder and Lightning, frees Professor Sakai, and returns Hellboy to the modern-day shrine. Hellboy eventually traps both spirits in the sword again, which reseals the dragons into the underworld. The ghosts of the daughter and the Daimyō possess Kate and Russell, in order to replay the daughter's execution. Hellboy accidentally frees the ghost of the samurai warrior from its stone form and then convinces the Daimyō to forgive his daughter and the warrior, thereby breaking the cycle of their unending deaths. The spirits depart, thankful to Hellboy and the others for helping them.

Cast
 Ron Perlman – Hellboy
 Selma Blair – Liz Sherman
 Doug Jones – Abe Sapien
 Peri Gilpin – Professor Kate Corrigan
 Dee Bradley Baker – Lightning, Kappa, Pilot
 Phil LaMarr – Bureau of Paranormal Research and Defense Member, Pilot
 Mitchell Whitfield – Russell Thorn
 Gwendoline Yeo – Kitsune
 Liza del Mundo – Additional voices
 Paul Nakauchi – Additional voices
 James Sie – Additional voices
 Kim Mai Guest – Additional voices
 Michael Hagiwara – Additional voices
 Yuriana Kim – Additional voices
 Clyde Kusatsu – Additional voices
 Keith Ferguson – Additional voices

Crew
 Ginny McSwain – Voice Director
 Stephen R. Brown – Producer

Reception
The reaction to the film was generally positive. It scored an 8.7 from IGN, although a critic for JoBlo.com gave the film one star out of five. The DVD special features, which include several commentaries and documentaries about the making of the film, were roundly praised. The voiceover work from returning cast members Perlman, Blair, and Jones was well-reviewed, as well as new addition Peri Gilpin as Kate.

Broadcast dates
Sword of Storms made its U.S. television debut on October 28, 2006 on Cartoon Network's Toonami Saturday action block (and aired again on December 30, 2006) and was released on DVD by Anchor Bay Entertainment on February 6, 2007. It aired alongside Hellboy: Blood and Iron on July 19, 2008 to promote the release of Hellboy II: The Golden Army.

References

External links
 
 
 
 Hellboy Animated Series Production Diary
 Preview of DVD

Sword of Storms
2006 animated films
2006 television films
2006 films
2006 fantasy films
2000s animated superhero films
Films produced by Guillermo del Toro
Toonami
Film Roman films
American animated superhero films
American animated science fiction films
Demons in film
Films about parallel universes
Films set in Japan
Japan in non-Japanese culture
Revolution Studios films
Superhero horror films
2000s American films